This is a list of notable people associated with Marist College in Poughkeepsie, New York.

Presidents 
 Br. Paul Ambrose Fontaine, FMS (1929–1958)
 Dr. Linus Richard Foy (1958–1979)
 Dennis J. Murray (1979–2016)
 David N. Yellen (2016–2019)
 Dennis J. Murray (2019–2021)
 Kevin Weinman (2021–)

Notable alumni

Academia
 Edward J. Cashin – historian and Professor Emeritus at Augusta State University

Arts & entertainment
 Adam Ferrara – actor and comedian
 Jon Gabrus '04 – comedian, television personality
 Bill O'Reilly '71 – political commentator
 Jeff Sutphen '98 – host of the game show  BrainSurge on Nickelodeon

Business
 Gina Trapani '97 – founder of Lifehacker; listed among Fast Companys Most Influential Women in Technology in 2009 and 2010

Government
 Eric Adams – Mayor of New York City, 18th Borough President of Brooklyn, and former New York State Senator
 Joseph Borelli  – New York City Councilman, former New York State Assembly Member
 Kevin Byrne '16 – Putnam County Executive - Elect (NY), and current New York State Assembly Member
 Daniel Dromm – member of New York City Council
 Bryan Kaenrath – member of the Maine House Of Representatives
 Patrick Mara – political strategist
Mike Martucci '08 – New York State Senator 
 Howard Mills III '86 – 38th New York Superintendent of Insurance; former member of the New York State Assembly 
 Paul X. Rinn '68 – Captain, United States Navy

Journalism
 Ed Lowe '67 – author and journalist
 Ian O'Connor '86 – New York Times best-selling author and national sports columnist

Religion
 Thomas John McDonnell – former Roman Catholic coadjutor bishop
 Seán Sammon '70 – Superior General of the Marist Brothers order

Sports
 Terrence Fede – professional football player
 Bobby Joe Hatton '99 – professional basketball player  
 Jared Jordan '07 – professional basketball player
 Adam Kemp – professional basketball player
Chavaughn Lewis (born 1993) - basketball player for Hapoel Galil Elyon of the Israeli Basketball Premier League
 Kathy Liebert – professional poker player
 Kevin McCarthy – professional baseball player
 Jason Myers – professional football player
 Rik Smits '88 – former NBA All-Star; 2nd pick in the 1988 NBA Draft
 Brandon Tierney '96 - baseball, host of Tiki and Tierney on WFAN.
 Menelik Watson – professional football player
 Sean Stellato – football and basketball, NFL sports agent

References

Marist College